Heiner Wilmer, SCJ (born 9 April 1961, in Schapen) is a German Catholic prelate who has served as the Bishop of Hildesheim since 2018. He was formerly the superior general of the Congregation of the Priests of the Sacred Heart (Dehonians).

Biography 
Wilmer grew up on a farm in Emsland. In 1980 he graduated at the Leoninum, a high school operated by the Dehonians in Handrup close to his hometown. In the same year, he entered the novitiate of the congregation in Freiburg. From 1981 to 1986 he studied theology in Freiburg and romance philology (romance languages) in Paris. After that he was ordained as priest by Archbishop Oskar Saier, the archbishop of Freiburg. He then went to Rome to study at the Gregorian Pontifical University; his focus was French philosophy. In 1991 Wilmer earned a Doctor of Theology in Freiburg, where he dealt with the concept of mysticism in the philosophy of Maurice Blondel. His works were awarded the Bernhard Welte Prize.

Shortly after that, he studied for a Master of Arts in History. Sometime before he finished his first master's degree Wilmer met the Dutch priest Henri Nouwen. At the request of Nouwen, Wilmer represented him for four months as a pastor at L'Arche Daybreak in Toronto, a facility for people with disabilities. After that he worked for two years as a school counselor and taught religion, political science and history at the Liebfrauenschule Vechta (a German high school) in Niedersachsen, Germany. In 1997 he went to the United States for a year to teach German and history at the Fordham Preparatory School, a Jesuit high school in the Bronx (New York). Upon his return, he became headmaster of the SCJ high school Leoninum in Handrup.

In 2007, Wilmer was elected for Provincial Superior of the German Province of the Dehonians.

Five years later he published a book (“Gott ist nicht nett – God is not kind”) in which he reflected on his faith and his decision to become a priest.

On 25 May 2015 Wilmer was elected by the Dehonians as superior general for a term of six years.

He succeeded José Ornelas Carvalho, SCJ, who held the office for 12 years (two six-year terms).

On 6 April 2018, the pope appointed Wilmer as Bishop of Hildesheim.

Positions 
In June 2019 he told the Süddeutsche Zeitung on the issue of celibacy for priests, that he himself is "a willingly passionate celibate religious" but the unmarried state of the clergy could be made to shine even brighter if it were not simply mandatory for all clerics.  He voted for the text of the German Synodal Way in favor of reforming Catholic sexual teaching.

Works 
 Mystik zwischen Tun und Denken: ein neuer Zugang zur Philosophie Maurice Blondels, Herder Freiburg 1992,  [Übersetzung ins Französische]
 Wer leben will, muss aufbrechen: spirituell lernen von Brasilien, Don Bosco, München 2010,  [Übersetzung ins Spanische]
 Johannes Duns Scotus „Tractatus de primo principio“: wissenschaftstheoretische Überlegungen, Bonn H. Wilmer 2013, 
 Gott ist nicht nett, Herder, Freiburg 2013,  [Übersetzung ins Tschechische] (together with Simon Biallowons)
 Trägt. Die Kunst, Hoffnung und Liebe zu glauben. Herder, Freiburg im Breisgau 2020,  (together with Simon Biallowons)

References

External links
English language
 Congregation of the Priests of the Sacred Heart - Dehonians
 DehoniansWorldwide
 US Province of the Priests of the Sacred Heart - Dehonians

German language
 Website der Deutschen Ordensprovinz der Herz-Jesu-Priester
 Literatur von Heiner Wilmer im Katalog der Deutschen Nationalbibliothek
 Heiner Wilmers Autorenporträt beim Herder Verlag
 Domradio vom 21. Mai 2013: Pater Dr. Heiner Wilmer SCJ – Gott ist nicht nett
 HR Camino vom 23. März 2014: Glauben ist einfach. Eine Radiosendung
 Deutschlandradio Kultur, Sendung Feiertag vom 11. Januar 2015: Ein Priester fragt nach seinem Glauben 

Superiors general
German male writers
21st-century German Roman Catholic bishops
21st-century Roman Catholic bishops in Germany
Roman Catholic bishops of Hildesheim
1961 births
Living people
People from Emsland
Dehonian bishops